Pengkhianatan G30S/PKI (Indonesian for Treachery of G30S/PKI) is a 1984 Indonesian propaganda docudrama written and directed by Arifin C. Noer, produced by G. Dwipayana, and starring Amoroso Katamsi, Umar Kayam, and Syubah Asa. Produced over a period of two years with a budget of Rp. 800 million, the film was sponsored by Suharto's New Order government. It was based on an official history of the 30 September Movement (or G30S) coup in 1965 written by Nugroho Notosusanto and Ismail Saleh, which depicted the coup as being orchestrated by the Communist Party of Indonesia (or PKI).

The film depicts the period leading up to the coup and several days after it. In a time of economic turmoil, six generals are kidnapped and killed by the PKI and Air Force, purportedly to pre-empt a coup against President Sukarno. General Suharto destroys the coup and, afterwards urges the Indonesian populace to commemorate those killed and fight against all forms of communism. The film shows the G30S leadership as ruthless and planning "every move to the last detail", taking joy in using excessive violence and torturing the generals, depictions which have been read as portraying "the state's enemies as outside the realm of the human".

The first commercially released domestic feature film to deal with the events of 1965, Pengkhianatan G30S/PKI was a commercial and critical success. It was nominated for seven awards at the 1984 Indonesian Film Festival, winning one, and reached record viewership numbers – although in many cases audiences were required to see the film. The film was used as a propaganda vehicle by the New Order government until its collapse; televised annually on 30 September and became mandatory viewing for students. Since the fall of Suharto in 1998, such use of the film has become less common. Although the film's artistic aspects remain well-received, its misrepresentation of history has been criticised.

Background 

Pengkhianatan G30S/PKI was based on the version of the coup endorsed by Suharto's New Order government, in which the 30 September Movement (or G30S) coup was allegedly orchestrated by the Communist Party of Indonesia (or PKI). In the early 1960s the PKI and other leftist parties had the support of President Sukarno, giving them great political power. By 1965 the PKI claimed millions of members, a growing number influenced by hyperinflation and widespread poverty. The Army, however, was distrustful of the PKI, a feeling which the PKI reciprocated.

On the night of 30 September–1 October 1965, a group of Indonesian National Armed Forces members calling themselves the 30 September Movement captured and killed six Army generals thought to belong to an anti-revolutionary "Generals' Council", including Commander of the Army Ahmad Yani; another target, Abdul Haris Nasution, escaped. The bodies, along with those of others captured by the G30S, were dumped down a well at Lubang Buaya, Jakarta.

Later that morning, armed forces occupied Merdeka Square in central Jakarta. From the Radio Republik Indonesia (RRI) office there, Lieutenant-Colonel Untung Syamsuri of the Presidential Guard announced that the movement had secured several key locations in the city in an attempt to forestall a coup by the Generals' Council. They also announced that President Sukarno was under their power. The movement's core leadership, later joined by the President, stayed at Halim Perdanakusuma Air Force Base.

Major-General Suharto, the interim leader after Yani's death, became aware of the movement on the morning of 1 October. By evening he had convinced a G30S battalion in Merdeka Square and those occupying the RRI building to surrender, without any bloodshed. Army loyalists under Suharto retook Halim Air Force Base early the following morning. By that time the G30S leadership had escaped, while Sukarno had withdrawn to his palace in Bogor. In the years that followed, the Indonesian Army and general populace undertook a campaign of retribution, killing or capturing registered and suspected PKI members – including most of the G30S leadership.

Plot 

The film begins with an anti-Westernization montage of Western products being burned.

Indonesia is in turmoil. The populace lives in poverty, while the rich flaunt their wealth. President Sukarno (Umar Kayam) is ill and may die. Meanwhile, his political concept of Nasakom (nationalism, religion, and communism) has promoted an explosive growth in the PKI. The party, which staged a coup in 1948, has been attacking and killing people throughout the country. The weakened president is also being manipulated by the party. The PKI has manufactured a story, based on the forged Gilchrist Document, that a Generals' Council is preparing for a coup should Sukarno die. Aidit (Syubah Asa), Syam, and the Communist Party leadership secretly plan to use this as an excuse for their own coup. The rank and file members of the Party accept the leadership's explanation and, with the help of "forward-thinking" soldiers and officers (mostly from the Air Force), work to gather the Party's forces. They plan to kidnap seven generals (said to be members of the Generals' Council), overtake the city, and secure Sukarno. The newly named G30S begins training. The rightist members of the Army are unaware of this upcoming coup, living happily with their families. By the time they realise that something is amiss, it is too late.

On the night of 30 September–1 October, seven units are sent to kidnap the generals associated with the Council. Nasution manages to escape over a wall, while his attaché Pierre Tendean comes running out, wielding a gun; Tendean is quickly captured and, when asked where Nasution is, confesses himself to be the general. Yani, who fights back, is killed in his home; Major General M. T. Haryono meets a similar fate. Chief Military Prosecutor Sutoyo Siswomiharjo, Major General Siswondo Parman, and Lieutenant General Soeprapto are captured. Brigadier General D. I. Pandjaitan goes willingly, but when he prays for too long before entering the truck he is killed. The bodies and prisoners are taken to the G30S/PKI camp in Lubang Buaya, where the survivors are tortured and killed. Their bodies are then thrown into a well. Later that morning, members of the movement take over the RRI office and force the staff there to read a speech by Untung (Bram Adrianto), which states that the G30S has moved to forestall a coup by the Generals' Council and announces the formation of a "Revolutionary Council". Other G30S/PKI men go to the palace to secure the president but find that he has already left. At Halim, the president speaks with the G30S leaders and declares that he will take full control of the Army. Another radio speech is soon read, outlining the composition of the new Revolutionary Council and announcing changes to Army hierarchy. The G30S leaders begin planning their escape from Halim, to be done before midnight.

Suharto (Amoroso Katamsi), awoken early in the morning, denies Untung's announcement, stating explicitly that there is no Generals' Council and making an adjunct record notes on the true nature of G30S. As there is a power vacuum with Yani dead, Suharto takes temporary control of the Army and begins planning a counter-assault with his men; he is, however, unwilling to force a fight. He instead states that he will give a radio announcement, which is delivered after forces loyal to him retake the RRI office; it outlines the situation, describes G30S as counter-revolutionary, and states that the Army will deal with the coup. The G30S leaders flee Halim, and Suharto's troops retake the air base. Some time later, forces under Suharto's leadership attack a G30S/PKI headquarters. While PKI-affiliated soldiers fight, the Party leadership escapes and separates, planning to continue their struggle underground.

Suharto is soon called to the secondary palace in Bogor to speak with Sukarno. There, the president says that he has received assurances from Air Marshal Omar Dani that the Air Force was not involved. Suharto refutes the statement, noting that the movement's arms were like those of the Air Force. The meeting eventually results in Suharto being confirmed as leader of the Army, working together with Pranoto Reksosamodra. In their investigation of the events, the Army discovers the camp at Lubang Buaya – including the generals' bodies, which are recovered while Suharto delivers a speech describing the coup and the PKI's role in it. The generals are interred elsewhere and Suharto delivers a hagiographic eulogy in which he condemns the G30S and PKI and urges the Indonesian people to continue the fallen generals' struggle.

Cast

Production 

Pengkhianatan G30S/PKI was directed by Arifin C. Noer, a Citra Award-winning director with a background in theatre. He had previous experience in the genre, having made the war film Serangan Fajar (Dawn Attack; 1981), which emphasised Suharto's role in the National Revolution. Noer was assigned to work on the film by the state-owned National Film Production Company (or PPFN), which maintained a degree of control over the production. Professors of Indonesian culture Krishna Sen and David T. Hill suggest that Noer's creative input was minimal. Instead, "for all intents and purposes" the film was the work of its producer, Brigadier-General Gufran Dwipayana, then the head of PPFN and a member of the presidential staff. However, Noer's wife Jajang C. Noer insists that he had remained independent while making the film.

The screenplay for Pengkhianatan G30S/PKI was based on a 1968 book by the military historian Nugroho Notosusanto and the investigator Ismail Saleh entitled The Coup Attempt of the 30 September Movement in Indonesia. The book, which was meant to counter foreign theories about the coup, detailed the 30 September Movement as the government viewed it. Only Notosusanto, the higher-ranking of the two authors, was credited for his contribution. In adapting the book Noer read much of the available literature (including court documents) and interviewed numerous eyewitnesses; Jajang, in a 1998 interview, said that her husband had not only read the official government version, but also the controversial Cornell Paper, which portrayed the coup as entirely an internal Army affair. During filming the crew emphasised realism, "paying great attention to detail" and using the generals' actual homes.

Owing to the large number of roles – including some 100 bit parts and more than 10,000 extras – casting for Pengkhianatan G30S/PKI was difficult. Noer attempted to cast actors who resembled the historical figures depicted; Rano Karno later recalled that he was rejected for the role of Pierre Tendean as the latter did not have a mole on his face. Ultimately the film starred Bram Adrianto as Untung, Amoroso Katamsi as Suharto, Umar Kayam as Sukarno, and Syubah Asa as Aidit; other actors included Ade Irawan, Sofia W.D., Dani Marsuni, and Charlie Sahetapy. Kayam, then a lecturer at Gadjah Mada University in Yogyakarta, did not have the time to research Sukarno's mannerisms from his books and speeches; instead, he portrayed the president based on testimonials from the staff at the Bogor palace. Katamsi, on the other hand, studied Suharto's role from books and, by the time filming had commenced, felt as if "was Pak Harto, not an imitation of Pak Harto." Sanusi, meanwhile, considered his own performance underwhelming.

Production of Pengkhianatan G30S/PKI, originally titled Sejarah Orde Baru (History of the New Order), took nearly two years, spending four months in pre-production and a year and half in filming. It cost Rp. 800 million, receiving funding from the government. Cinematography was handled by Hasan Basri, with music by Arifin's brother Embie C. Noer. Editing was done by Supandi. Parts of the film, particularly the final ten minutes, reused archival footage and newspaper clippings contemporaneous to the events.

Themes 

Pengkhianatan G30S/PKI portrays the PKI and communism as inherently evil, with its followers "beyond redemption", while the G30S leadership are seen as cunning and ruthless, plotting "every move to the last detail". The historian Katherine McGregor finds this emphasised in the film's portrayal of the G30S leadership as gangsters, sitting in secret meetings amidst clouds of cigarette smoke. She considers an opening scene, where the PKI attacks an Islamic school, as likewise meant to show the "evil" nature of communists.

The PKI are portrayed as enjoying violence, with the film heavily featuring "eye-gouging women and decomposed, tortured bodies". The generals are kidnapped, and in several cases killed, in front of their families; later the captured generals are tortured while the communists dance around a bonfire. The sociologist Adrian Vickers suggests that the film's violence was meant to portray "the state's enemies as outside the realm of the human", similar to monsters in horror films. Yoseph Yapi Taum of Sanata Dharma University notes that members of the leftist women's movement Gerwani are shown as part of a "crazy" Communist Party, dancing in the nude and cutting off the general's penises. However, Vickers considers these portrayals as ambiguous, suggesting that the New Order government was allowed a monopoly on violence. McGregor suggests that the violence in once-tranquil homes shows the "'destruction' of the family". Sen notes the violence belies a "representation of chaos before order" which is common in New Order films.

Release 

Before its commercial release, Pengkhianatan G30S/PKI was pre-screened in January 1984 for high-ranking military officers who had been involved in stopping the coup, including Suharto and Sarwo Edhie Wibowo. The film was released in December 1984, the first commercially released domestic feature film to deal with the events of 1965. It was seen by 699,282 people in Jakarta by the end of 1984, a national record which remained unbroken for over a decade. However, not all audiences attended of their own volition. The Indonesian sociologist Ariel Heryanto records students as being "required to pay" to see the film during school hours, a fact not reflected in contemporary records. A novelisation by popular writer Arswendo Atmowiloto likewise helped promote the film.

Dwipayana's influence ensured that contemporary reviews, especially synopses, repeated the government's position on the G30S coup. This is not to say all reviews were positive. Marselli of Kompas, for instance, found that Pengkhianatan G30S/PKI was highly detailed, with extensive work and quality acting going to represent events accurately. He felt, however, that the film felt too long and, as viewers knew instantly who the good and bad characters were, it became "nothing but a black-and-white portrait without any complex issues", which ignored the underlying problems which had sparked the G30S movement.

Suharto, after viewing an early screening, stated that the story was unfinished and suggested that a sequel was necessary. Two sequels by PPFN, Operasi Trisula (Operation Trisula; 1987) and Djakarta 1966 (Jakarta 1966; 1988), followed. Operasi Trisula, directed by BZ Kadaryono, dealt with the extermination of G30S and PKI members in Blitar, East Java. Djakarta 1966, meanwhile, was directed by Noer and showed the lead-up to the signing of Supersemar on 11 March 1966, in which Sukarno gave Suharto authority to take whatever measures he "deemed necessary"; Kayam and Katamsi reprised their roles for the latter film, which won seven awards at the 1989 Bandung Film Festival.

Accolades 

Pengkhianatan G30S/PKI received seven nominations at the 1984 Indonesian Film Festival (or FFI), including a Citra Award for Best Film, winning one Citra Award for Best Screenplay. It was beaten in four categories: for Best Director, Best Cinematography, Best Leading Actor (Katamsi), and Best Musical Direction, by Sjumandjaja's Budak Nafsu (Slave to Passion), while Slamet Rahardjo's Ponirah Terpidana (Ponirah Convicted) took Best Artistic Direction. For the latter category, the nomination's recipient was Farraz Effendy. At the 1985 FFI Pengkhianatan G30S/PKI received an Antemas Award as the best-selling film of the preceding calendar year. The film scholar Thomas Barker suggests that the film's awards were, in part, a conjunction of state and FFI interests: both were focused on promoting a united national culture.

Propaganda use 

Beginning in 1984 the New Order government used Pengkhianatan G30S/PKI as a propaganda vehicle, showing it annually on 30 September. The film was broadcast by the state-owned network TVRI, and later on private television stations after they were established. It was also shown at schools and government institutions; students would be taken to open fields to view the film in a group. Because of this use, Sen and Hill suggest that Pengkhianatan G30S/PKI is the most-broadcast and most-watched Indonesian film of all time. A 2000 survey by the Indonesian magazine Tempo found 97 percent of the 1,101 students surveyed had seen the film; 87 percent of them had seen it more than once.

During the remainder of the 1980s and early 1990s the historical accuracy of Pengkhianatan G30S/PKI was little disputed, and the film became representative of canonical history; its version of the 1965 events was the only one allowed in open discourse. By the mid-1990s, however, anonymous Internet communities and small publications had begun questioning the film's contents; one online message, sent anonymously through a mailing list, asked "If only a small section of the PKI leadership and military agents knew about [the coup, as in the film], how is it that over a million people were killed and thousands of people who knew nothing had to be imprisoned, exiled, and lost their civil rights?" Heryanto suggests that this resulted from an unintended polyphony in the film, while Sen and Hill opine that Noer may have been aware of the government's intent for propaganda and thus made the film's political message "obviously contradictory".

In September 1998, four months after the fall of Suharto, the Information Minister Yunus Yosfiah declared that the film would no longer be compulsory viewing material, reasoning that it was an attempt to manipulate history and create a cult with Suharto in the centre. Tempo reported in 2012 that Saleh Basarah of the Indonesian Air Force (former Chief of Staff of the Air Force) had influenced this decree. The magazine stated that Basarah had called the Education Minister Juwono Sudarsono and asked him to not screen Pengkhianatan G30S/PKI, as it was damaging to the Air Force. Two other films, Janur Kuning (Yellow Coconut Leaves; 1979) and Serangan Fajar, were likewise affected by the decree; Janur Kuning portrayed Suharto as the hero behind the historic General Offensive of 1 March 1949 in Yogyakarta while Serangan Fajar showed him as a major hero of the National Revolution. At the time it was suggested that TVRI was attempting to distance itself from the former president. This occurred in a period of desanctifying symbols related to the events, and by the early 2000s non-government versions of the G30S coup were easily available in Indonesia.

Legacy 

Pengkhianatan G30S/PKI has proven to be Noer's most controversial film, although until his death in 1995 the director remained publicly ambivalent. The film's visuals have generally received positive reviews, but its use for propaganda and historical accuracy have been widely condemned. The Indonesian director Hanung Bramantyo praised the film's style, stating that close-up shots of men smoking were "brilliant" and that, at times, he felt "it's not a film. But real!" The director Monty Tiwa likewise praised the film's shots, citing a scene where Pandjaitan's daughter cries hysterically as her father is shot as "full of drama and using a shot [he had] never seen before in an Indonesian film". Sen and Hill, however, find "none of the aesthetic hallmarks" of the director's other works. In 2018, the Vice journalist Arzia Tivany Wargadiredja categorized Pengkhianatan G30S/PKI a propaganda film.

Hilmar Farid, an Indonesian historian, called the film propaganda mixed with "some [of the New Order's] fantasies". The reporter Hendro Subroto, who recorded the retrieval of the generals' bodies from Lubang Buaya, criticised the film's accuracy in 2001; he stated that the bodies did not show any evidence of torture. The former Lekra writer Putu Oka Sukanta, meanwhile, described the film as underplaying the suffering of PKI members and other leftists in the events following the G30S coup, thus becoming "a lie to the people". The historian John Roosa contrasts the portrayal of the G30S leadership with a document by Brigadier General M.A. Supardjo, which portrays the coup – led by "flummoxed, indecisive, and disorganized" men – as largely defeating itself.

In a 2012 interview, Katamsi admitted the film was in part overacted and that it had been a potent way to spread and indoctrinate viewers in the New Order's ideology. The Tempo survey suggested that it was effective propaganda, leading viewers to "reject all that smelled of the PKI and communism". Although it is no longer broadcast on 30 September, the film remains available. A video CD edition was released by Virgo in 2001 and the G30S/PKI museum at Lubang Buaya offers regular screenings in an on-site cinema. Both a 35 mm and VHS copy are stored at Sinematek Indonesia in Jakarta.

From 2017, 20 years after the last time it was a mandatory showing on national televisions, several groups began hosting watch parties of the film to coincide with the day of the incident, following demands by Islamist groups.  In 2018, SCTV voluntarily aired the film; tvOne (who had also aired it the previous year) and TVRI followed suit the following year. In 2021, TVRI decided that it would not air the film on 30 September that year, citing the 1998 decision where it was no longer treated as a compulsory viewing material.

See also

 The Year of Living Dangerously, a 1982 Australian film framed around the G30S coup
 Puisi Tak Terkuburkan, a 2000 Indonesian film following a poet who is wrongly arrested for being a communist
 The Act of Killing (2012) and The Look of Silence (2014), a pair of documentary films about the killings of communists after the coup

Explanatory notes

References

Works cited

External links
 

Communist Party of Indonesia
Docudrama films
Films directed by Arifin C. Noer
Films set in Indonesia
Indonesian mass killings of 1965–1966
Indonesian propaganda films
Films about coups d'état
Produksi Film Negara films